Leeuwarderadeel is a former municipality in the northern Netherlands. Its capital was Stiens.

History
On 1 January 2018 it merged with the municipality of Leeuwarden.

Population centres 
 Bartlehiem
 Britsum
 Cornjum
 Finkum
 Hijum
 Jelsum
 Oude Leije
 Stiens

Topography

Dutch Topographic map of the municipality of Leeuwarderadeel, June 2015.

Bartlehiem 
The hamlet of Bartlehiem is partially in Leeuwarderadeel partially in Ferwerderadiel and partially in Tytsjerksteradiel.

References

External links
 
 Official website

Leeuwarden
Former municipalities of Friesland
Municipalities of the Netherlands disestablished in 2018